The Pirates of Somalia (titled Deadly Waters in the UK and Australia) is a nonfiction book by Canadian journalist Jay Bahadur about his experiences and observations living among pirates in the autonomous region of Puntland during an upsurge in Somali piracy. An advance excerpt appeared in a May 2011 edition of The Guardian.

See also
 The Pirate Tapes, a documentary film

References

External links
 After Words interview with Bahadur on The Pirates of Somalia, August 13, 2011

2011 non-fiction books
Books about Somalia
Non-fiction books about organized crime
Piracy in Somalia
Profile Books books
Pantheon Books books